Warren Adler (December 16, 1927 – April 15, 2019) was an American author, playwright and poet. His novel The War of the Roses was turned into a dark comedy starring Michael Douglas, Kathleen Turner and Danny DeVito.

Adler was an essayist, short-story writer, poet and playwright, whose works have been translated into 25 languages.

Education and early career 
Adler was born in Brooklyn, New York, the son of Fritzie and Sol Adler. His parents were Russian Jewish immigrants. He graduated from P.S. 91, Brooklyn Technical High School, New York University, and attended the New School. Among his classmates were Mario Puzo and William Styron. In 2009, Adler was the recipient of the "Alumni of the Year" honor at NYU's College of Arts and Science and was also the founder of the Jackson Hole Writer's Conference, WY. During his residence in Jackson Hole, Wyoming, Adler was Chairman of the Library Board.

After graduating from NYU with a degree in English literature, Adler worked for the New York Daily News before becoming editor of the Queens Post weekly. During the Korean War, he served in the US Army in the Pentagon as the Washington Correspondent for Armed Forces Press Service. Before his success as a novelist, Adler had a career as an entrepreneur. He owned four radio stations and a TV station, and founded and ran his own advertising and public relations agency in Washington, D.C.; his firm Warren Adler Ltd. was responsible for advertising and PR campaigns for political candidates, businesses and communities. Among his clients was the Watergate complex, which Adler named. He closed his agency in 1974 after the publication of his first novel, Undertow, and devoted himself to a writing career. He sponsored the Warren Adler Short Story contest on the Web.

Writing career 
Adler wrote The War of the Roses and Random Hearts. The War of the Roses was adapted into a feature film starring Michael Douglas, Kathleen Turner, and Danny DeVito in 1989. Random Hearts was adapted into a film starring Harrison Ford and Kristin Scott Thomas in 1999. There was a bidding war in a Hollywood commission for his unpublished book Private Lies. Newsweek reported, "TriStar Pictures outbid Warner Bros and Columbia, and purchased the film rights to Private Lies for $1.2 million. …the highest sums yet paid in Hollywood for an unpublished manuscript."

Adler also wrote The Sunset Gang, produced by Linda Lavin for the American Playhouse series. It was adapted into a trilogy starring Uta Hagen, Harold Gould, Dori Brenner, Jerry Stiller and Ron Rifkin, and gained Doris Roberts an Emmy nomination for Best Supporting Actress in a Mini-Series. The musical version of The Sunset Gang received an off-Broadway production with music scored by composer L. Russell Brown.
 
In 1981, Adler wrote a sequel to The War of the Roses, The Children of the Roses. It focuses on the effect the Roses' divorce had on their children.

On October 29, 1986, he started his own production company Soaring Eagle Productions, to develop Hollywood film adaptations of his novels, such as We Are Holding the President Hostage, which is the first film to go before the cameras, and he developed The War of the Roses, Trans-Siberian Express and Random Hearts.

Adler was early involved in electronic publishing. In the early 2000s, he predicted the decline of printed books and he envisioned digital publishing becoming the norm. He acquired his complete back-list, published now under his own company, Stonehouse Press. He wrote an article for The Author's Guild stating that authors had best prepare for a major change in the way traditional publishing businesses operated. He argued that they no longer had a monopoly on marketing, distribution, publicity, and content, and stated prolific authors like himself should take charge of their own destiny.

Adler regularly blogged for The Huffington Post and was the sponsor of a visiting writer series at the New York university department of creative writing. He was a member of the Authors Guild, PEN America, the Dramatists Guild and the Writers Guild of America.

The War of the Roses 
The stage play has premiered internationally in Belgium, Italy, Germany, Denmark, Czech Republic, Norway, Iceland, Argentina, Chile, Mexico, Uruguay, France, Brazil, and Netherlands. A Broadway production is planned.

Fiona Fitzgerald series 
This mystery series revolves around Fiona Fitzgerald, a woman in her 30s who was born into the illustrious family of a New York senator but chose to break away and become a homicide detective.

American Quartet is the first book, and it was not originally planned as a series until the New York Times listed the novel on its list of "Notable Crime Fiction" in December 1982, and calling it "high-class suspense." Following American Quartet, Fiona embarks on a long journey of harrowing cases throughout eight other books. American Sextet deals with a sex scandal involving six of the most important individuals in Washington D.C. Immaculate Deception deals with a congresswoman who is an anti-abortion supporter—she is not only found dead, but pregnant. The Witch of Watergate focuses on the death of a gossip columnist, who is discovered hanging from a balcony in the Watergate apartment complex. Senator Love is about a womanizing senator whose lover is found murdered. Ties That Bind focuses on a sado-masochistic killing in a Washington D.C. hotel. The Death of a Washington Madame is about the murder of one of Washington D.C.'s most important hostesses. And in Washington Masquerade, the latest novel in the series, Fiona unravels the death of a prominent Washington Post political columnist and fierce critic of the administration.

Personal life
Adler's three children are David, Jonathan, and Michael, an actor.

On April 15, 2019, Warren died of liver cancer in his Manhattan apartment. He was 91.

Bibliography

Novels 

 The War of the Roses
 The Children of the Roses
 The Sunset Gang
 Target Churchill
 The David Embrace
 Flanagan's Dolls
 The Womanizer
 Residue
 Empty Treasures
 Random Hearts
 Funny Boys
 Trans-Siberian Express
 Mourning Glory
 Cult
 The Casanova Embrace
 Blood Ties
 Natural Enemies
 Banquet Before Dawn
 The Housewife Blues
 Madeline's Miracles
 We Are Holding the President Hostage
 Private Lies
 Twilight Child
 The Norma Conquest
 The Henderson Equation
 Undertow
 The Serpent's Bite
 Treadmill
 Torture Man
 Mother Nile
 Heart of Gold
 High Noon in Hollywood
 Finding Grace: Captured by a Cult

Short stories 
 Warren Adler Short Story Contest Winners
 New York Echoes 1
 New York Echoes 2
 The Sunset Gang
 Never Too Late for Love
 Jackson Hole: Uneasy Eden
 The Washington Dossier Diaries

The Fiona Fitzgerald Mysteries
 American Quartet
 American Sextet
 Death of a Washington Madame
 The Witch of Watergate
 Senator Love
 Immaculate Deception
 The Ties That Bind
 Washington Masquerade
 Red Herring

References

External links
 Warren Adler's personal website and blog

1927 births
2019 deaths
20th-century American novelists
20th-century American male writers
New York University alumni
American male novelists
Brooklyn Technical High School alumni
The New School alumni
Novelists from New York (state)
Military personnel from New York City
Writers from Brooklyn
Editors of New York City newspapers
Deaths from cancer in New York (state)
Deaths from liver cancer
Jewish American writers
American people of Russian-Jewish descent
United States Army soldiers
21st-century American Jews